Spirit of Kangaroo Island is a vehicular ferry operated by Kangaroo Island SeaLink on the 18 kilometre Cape Jervis to Penneshaw route across Backstairs Passage along with the Sealion 2000. These two ferries provide the main form of transport to Kangaroo Island operating up to 10 trips daily.

She was built in 2003 by Austal, Fremantle.

References

Ferries of South Australia
Kangaroo Island
2003 ships
Backstairs Passage